Moneythink is an American educational non-profit organization that aims to increase the financial capability of American youth by training college volunteers to serve as financial mentors for low-income high school students. The organization is self-described as "the only movement of young people working to restore the economic health of America through financial education." Moneythink's curriculum involves the use of a mobile app to help students demonstrate their financial skills. In 2014, Moneythink began licensing this technology to other partners as a means of providing more students with financial empowerment tools. Over the course of the year-long Financial Capability Curriculum, mentors teach weekly classes covering a wide range of basic financial practices and business strategies. The program also offers pre-professional activities for students to engage in, including business pitching competitions, job shadows, and visits to professional workplaces.

History 
Moneythink began as a student organization at the University of Chicago in 2009. Initially named the American Investment Fellows, the club was founded by students Ted Gonder, Greg Nance, Shashin Chokshi, Morgan Hartley, and David Chen. The group's aim was to help the South Chicago community in the wake of the economic collapse by recruiting, training, and placing undergraduate economics majors in local inner-city 11th and 12th-grade classrooms to teach financial literacy workshops.

In the fall of 2009, student-leaders at Washington University in St. Louis, USC, and other universities across the US began to work with the Chicago chapter and started identical clubs on their own campuses. Between the spring of 2010 and the fall of 2011 the concept spread to 24 campus communities nationwide. During this time, the campuses aligned under the collective name Moneythink and took on hundreds of volunteer mentors. Moneythink incubated at the Kauffman Foundation, where Ted Gonder professionalized the organization, and eventually gained official 501(c)(3) non-profit status.

In 2011, Moneythink named Gonder their chief executive officer and brought on board a full-time staff. In 2012, Moneythink received the White House Champions of Change award and set the goal of achieving mainstream financial capability among American youth by 2030. In the winter of that same year, the organization's logo was featured on the NASDAQ billboard in Times Square.

In 2013, Moneythink collaborated with IDEO to develop a mobile app to be used in classrooms along with the Financial Capability Curriculum. In 2014, the app officially launched for use in participating classrooms.

In the fall of 2020, Moneythink released a college affordability tool, DecidED. Using its human-centered design principles and solutions, the tool supports low-income and 1st-gen students to plan for, cover, and manage all of their college costs through a healthy mix of financial aid that includes; grants, scholarships, savings, loans, and work.

Reach 
Moneythink programs currently operate at 31 universities across the United States. The organization consists of over 600 student mentors and claims to have reached over 6,000 students.

Recognition 
 2020 Capital One Nonprofit Give Back Partner of the Year 
 2019 Goldman Sachs Gives Analyst Impact Fund Finalist 
 2013 winner of the State Farm Neighborhood Assist grant.
 2013 MassChallenge winner.
 2012 winner of Chicago Innovation Awards Up-and-Comer Award.
 2012 finalist in the Booth School of Business Social New Venture Challenge.
 2012 winner of the White House's Champions of Change Campus Challenge.
 Rang the NASDAQ stock market closing bell on February 25, 2012.

References

Non-profit organizations based in Chicago
Non-profit organizations based in California
Higher education in the United States
Financial technology